Massimo Corey Luongo (born 25 September 1992) is an Australian professional footballer who plays as a midfielder for League One club Ipswich Town and the Australia national team.

Born in Sydney, Luongo played youth football for APIA Leichhardt Tigers before moving to England to play for Tottenham Hotspur, where he started his professional career. Following a loan spell at Ipswich Town, he played on loan at Swindon Town, a move which was eventually made permanent. After four years at Queens Park Rangers, he joined Sheffield Wednesday in 2019.

Luongo has played for the Australia national team since 2014 and has made over 40 appearances. He was a member of the squad at the 2014 FIFA World Cup and played a central role in Australia winning the 2015 AFC Asian Cup, where he scored in the final and was named player of the tournament.

Early life
Luongo was born in Sydney. His father Mario is of Italian heritage and mother Ira Luongo is of Indonesian heritage. He attended Waverley College. He is the youngest of three children; he has a sister Angela and a brother Tiziano. In addition to holding an Australian passport, Luongo also has an Italian passport.

According to Luongo himself, his maternal great-grandfather was Sultan Ambela Abu'l-Khair Sirajuddin of Bima Sultanate based in Sumbawa.

Club career

Tottenham Hotspur
Luongo signed for Tottenham Hotspur in January 2011 after impressing on trial, and went on to make nine appearances for the under-18 team during the 2010–11 Premier Academy League season, scoring three goals. He made his only appearance for the first team on 20 September 2011 in a 7–6 penalty shootout loss to fellow Premier League club Stoke City in the third round of the League Cup, replacing Sandro after 70 minutes. Luongo had his penalty attempt saved by Thomas Sørensen, resulting in the defeat.

On 6 February 2012, he was called up to a league match for the first time, remaining an unused substitute as Tottenham earned a goalless draw away to Liverpool. Thirteen days later he was included in the squad for the last time, again unused in a goalless FA Cup fifth round match away to League One team Stevenage.

Ipswich Town (loan)
On 23 July 2012, Luongo joined Championship side Ipswich Town on a season-long loan for the 2012–13 season. He made his debut on 14 August in the first round of the League Cup, playing the entirety of a 3–1 win over League Two club Bristol Rovers at Portman Road. Four days later he played his first professional league game, starting in a 1–1 home draw against Blackburn Rovers and making way for Andy Drury after 70 minutes.  On 28 August, in the second round of the League Cup against Carlisle United at Brunton Park, he scored from outside the penalty area to put Ipswich ahead with his first professional goal, but Carlisle scored a late equaliser and won 2–1 after extra time.

The loan was terminated on 9 November after new Ipswich manager Mick McCarthy said that he wanted a 'different type of player'.

Swindon Town
On 28 March 2013, Luongo signed for Swindon Town on loan along with fellow Spurs trainees Nathan Byrne and Dean Parrett. The very next day he went straight into the squad to face Oldham Athletic and play the full 90 minutes in a 1–1 draw at the County Ground. On 16 April, Luongo scored his first goal for Swindon in a 4–1 win over Crewe Alexandra, heading in Gary Roberts' cross. He opened the scoring on 4 May in the 70th minute of the first leg of the play-off semi-final against Brentford, but in added time conceded a penalty by fouling Harry Forrester; Kevin O'Connor converted it for a 1–1 draw. Swindon eventually lost the tie in a penalty shootout.

Luongo signed a season-long loan deal with Swindon Town on 2 July 2013 and was handed the number 4 shirt.

At the end of August 2013, Swindon signed Luongo on a permanent three-year contract having agreed a fee of £400,000 with Spurs. He scored six goals in 44 league appearances that season, including a first professional brace in a 5–2 home win over Port Vale on 2 November. In the following campaign, he got just as many goals but in 34 matches, as Swindon lost the play-off final to Preston North End at Wembley Stadium.

Queens Park Rangers

On 28 May 2015, Luongo joined Queens Park Rangers, along with Swindon Town teammate Ben Gladwin, both signing a three-year deal. QPR head coach Chris Ramsey was Luongo's youth coach at Tottenham. He made his debut in the first game of the Championship season on 8 August, playing the full 90 minutes of a 2–0 defeat at Charlton Athletic. Luongo played 30 league games in his first season – 32 overall –  but did not score. His performances earned him a place on the FIFA Ballon d'Or longlist for the 2015 campaign.

He scored his first goal for QPR in a 5–1 win over Rotherham United on 18 March 2017. Following Nedum Onouha's ruptured hamstring injury that November, Luongo was handed the responsibility of captaincy.

Sheffield Wednesday
On 8 August 2019, Luongo joined Sheffield Wednesday for an undisclosed fee. He made his debut the following weekend, coming off the bench against Barnsley. He scored his first goal for the club against Wigan Athletic, which was also his first start for the club. He was sent off in a game against Blackburn Rovers, but the red card was later rescinded.

In his second season at the club he was injured several times, the first being in a game against Luton Town, returning on 7 December 2020. He was ruled out again for another five to six weeks on 24 February 2021.

After another injury layoff, he would return to the squad at the start of 2022 with some impressive performances, winning the clubs January Player-of-the-Month competition, as well as appearing in two of EFL's Team of the Week after his performances against Ipswich Town and Plymouth Argyle. The club announced he was offered a new contract following the end of the 2021-22 season. On 22 June 2022, it was confirmed that he had rejected his new contract and would leave the club.

Middlesbrough
On 8 September 2022, Luongo joined Middlesbrough on a short term deal until January 2023.  On the 5th January 2023, the club announced that they had agreed to cancel his contract to allow the player to move elsewhere.

Ipswich Town
On 5 January 2023, Luongo joined Ipswich on a six-month contract after having been training with the squad for three weeks prior.

International career

Luongo represented the Australia under-20 team twice but was not selected for the 2011 FIFA U-20 World Cup.

He made his debut for the Socceroos on 6 March 2014 as a second-half substitute for captain Mile Jedinak in the 3–4 loss to Ecuador at The New Den in London. He was selected for the 23-man Australia squad for the 2014 FIFA World Cup in Brazil by manager Ange Postecoglou, but did not feature in any of their three matches as they were eliminated in the group stage.

Luongo was also selected in the 23-man squad for the Asia Cup to be played on home soil in Australia. Swindon teammate Yaser Kasim was also called up for Iraq, meaning that the club would have to compete in their regular League One season without the two central midfielders for a month. He went on to score in Australia's 4–1 win over Kuwait in the opening game of the tournament, in addition to providing the assist that led to Tim Cahill scoring Australia's first goal of the match. At the end of the game, he was named as man of the match. Luongo also started in Australia's second group game against Oman, providing the assist for Robbie Kruse to score Australia's second goal in an eventual 4–0 win. He played in the 2015 AFC Asian Cup Final against South Korea, scoring the first goal from outside the box in a 2–1 win.  He was named as Most Valuable Player of the tournament after scoring two goals and assisting four throughout the tournament.

In May 2018 he was named in Australia's 23-man squad for the 2018 FIFA World Cup in Russia.

Career statistics

Club

International

Scores and results list Australia's goal tally first, score column indicates score after each Luongo goal.

Honours
Australia
AFC Asian Cup: 2015

Individual
PFA Team of the Year: 2014–15 League One
AFC Asian Cup Most Valuable Player: 2015
AFC Asian Cup Team of the Tournament: 2015
AFC Asian International Player of the Year third-place: 2015

Notes

References

External links

Tottenham Hotspur profile

 Massimo Luongo Interview
 Massimo Luongo Interview with The Guardian

1992 births
Living people
Australian people of Italian descent
Australian people of Indonesian descent
Australia international soccer players
Association football midfielders
Australian expatriate soccer players
Tottenham Hotspur F.C. players
Ipswich Town F.C. players
Swindon Town F.C. players
Queens Park Rangers F.C. players
Sheffield Wednesday F.C. players
Middlesbrough F.C. players
English Football League players
Australian expatriate sportspeople in England
Expatriate footballers in England
2014 FIFA World Cup players
2015 AFC Asian Cup players
2017 FIFA Confederations Cup players
Soccer players from Sydney
AFC Asian Cup-winning players
2018 FIFA World Cup players
2019 AFC Asian Cup players
Australian soccer players